Cai Xiang (1012–1067) was a Chinese calligrapher, politician, structural engineer, and poet. He had the reputation as the greatest calligrapher in the Song dynasty.

Biography 
He was born during the Dazhongxiangfu era of the Song dynasty in Xianyou county of Xinghua prefecture, now Xianyou County in Putian of Fujian province.

In the eight year of the Tiansheng era (1030 CE) he obtained the degree of jinshi (進士, lit. "advanced scholar"), a graduate who passed the triennial court exam. His highest rank was Secretariat Drafter of the Duanming Court (Duanmingdian Xueshi), in charge of written communication of the imperial government. During the Qingli era (1041–1048 CE), he was the Officer of Transportation (Zhuanyunshi) in Fujian. While acting as a prefect in Fujian, he also was in charge of overseeing the construction of the Wan-an Bridge at Quanzhou.

He pioneered the manufacturing of small Dragon Tribute Tea Cake of superlative quality, as it was reputed to be harder to obtain than gold.

Cai Xiang's style name was Junmo, and his posthumous name was Zhonghuei.

Works  
One of his most famous publications is his essay "The Record of Tea", also known as the "Tea Note", which he wrote in 1049–1053.

 Calligraphy: Wan'an Bridge Report Tablet
 Poetry: Collected Works of Cai Zhonghuei
 Letter: Letter on Cheng Xin Tang Paper

Quotes

See also 
Lu Yu (733–804), writer of "The Classic of Tea"

References

External links 

1012 births
1067 deaths
11th-century Chinese calligraphers
11th-century Chinese poets
11th-century Chinese architects
Artists from Fujian
Chinese structural engineers
Chinese tea masters
Engineers from Fujian
People from Putian
Poets from Fujian
Song dynasty calligraphers
Song dynasty poets